This is a comprehensive discography of official recordings by the Wallflowers, an American alternative rock band originally from Los Angeles.

Albums

Studio albums

Digital albums
iTunes Originals – The Wallflowers

Compilation albums

Singles

Soundtracks
The Wallflowers have had numerous original and cover songs featured in television and movie soundtracks:

Other appearances
"One Headlight" (on Excess Baggage, 1997)
"Angel on My Bike" (on KCRW Rare on Air, Vol. 3, 1997)
"Used to Be Lucky" (on No Boundaries: A Benefit for the Kosovar Refugees, 1999)
"Too Late for Goodbyes" (on Trampoline Records Greatest Hits, Vol. II, 2003)
"Lawyers, Guns, and Money" (on Enjoy Every Sandwich: The Songs of Warren Zevon, 2004)
"Gimme Some Truth" written by John Lennon. Jakob Dylan and Dhani Harrison (on Instant Karma: The Amnesty International Campaign to Save Darfur, 2007)

References

Discography
Discographies of American artists
Rock music group discographies
Alternative rock discographies